Mizda or Mesdah (Tamazight: ⵎⵉⵣⴷⴰ, Mizda) is a town in the Nafusa Mountains in Libya. It was the capital of the former Mizda District. 

Just to the west of Mizda is the Mizda Army Base at

See also 
 List of cities in Libya

Notes

External links
 "Mizda Map — Satellite Images of Mizda"

Populated places in Jabal al Gharbi District